The first season of the De Férias com o Ex: Caribe, premiered on MTV on January 13, 2022. It features ten singles living together on Isla Barú, Colombia with their ex-partners.

Cast 
The list of cast members was released on December 2, 2021. They include five women; Angietta Rodríguez, Camila Costa (De Férias com o Ex 6), Haeixa Pinheiro, Leticia Oliveira and Mariana Franco, and five men; Carlos Ortega, Gabriel Sampaio, João Vitor "Jotave" Pimentel, Mario Abraham (Are You the One? El Match Perfecto 2) and Vasco "Vascki" Pineda.

Notable exes include João Hadad (De Férias com o Ex 6) and Mariana "Mary" Magalhães (Rio Shore).

Bold indicates original cast member; all other cast were brought into the series as an ex.

Duration of cast 

Key
  Cast member is featured in this episode
  Cast member arrives on the beach
  Cast member has an ex arrive on the beach
  Cast member arrives on the beach and has an ex arrive during the same episode
  Cast member leaves the beach
  Cast member does not feature in this episode

Episodes

References

External links 
 Official website 

De Férias com o Ex seasons
2022 Brazilian television seasons
Ex on the Beach